The 1988 Illinois Fighting Illini football team was an American football team that represented the University of Illinois at Urbana-Champaign during the 1988 NCAA Division I-A football season. In their first year under head coach John Mackovic, the Illini compiled a 6–5–1 record, finished in third place in the Big Ten Conference, and lost to Florida in the 1988 All-American Bowl.

The team's offensive leaders were quarterback Jeff George with 2,257 passing yards, running back Keith Jones with 1,108 rushing yards, and Steve Williams with 523 receiving yards.

Schedule

References

Illinois
Illinois Fighting Illini football seasons
Illinois Fighting Illini football